Mitch Leigh (born Irwin Michnick; January 30, 1928March 16, 2014) was an American musical theatre composer and theatrical producer best known for the musical Man of La Mancha.

Biography

Early years
Leigh was born in Brooklyn, New York as Irwin Michnick. He graduated from Yale in 1951 with a Bachelor of Music, and in 1952 received his Master of Music under Paul Hindemith.

He began his career as a jazz musician, and writing commercials for radio and television. On the 1955 LP recording of Jean Shepherd Into the Unknown with Jazz Music Leigh wrote the jazz interludes between radio broadcaster Jean Shepherd's improvisations.

Broadway
In 1965, Leigh collaborated with lyricist Joe Darion and writer Dale Wasserman to write a musical based on Wasserman's 1959 television play, I, Don Quixote. The resulting show, the musical Man of La Mancha opened on Broadway in 1965 and in its original engagement ran for 2,328 performances, and has been revived multiple times.

Leigh followed with the show Chu Chem, which he also produced, exactly a year after Man of La Mancha, but closed on the road. It finally opened on Broadway in 1989 but ran for only 68 performances.

Cry for Us All, based on the play, Hogan's Goat, opened on Broadway in 1970 but ran for 9 performances. Leigh was the producer as well as composer.  His musical Home Sweet Homer, starring Yul Brynner, officially opened on Broadway in January 1976 but closed after 1 performance. He produced and wrote the music for Saravá which ran for 101 performances in 1979. Leigh both produced and directed the 1985 revival of The King and I starring Brynner featuring in his final performances as the King of Siam.

Lee Adams asked Leigh to collaborate on a musical titled Mike, about producer Mike Todd, but it closed during its pre-Broadway tryout in 1988. After renaming it Ain't Broadway Grand!, the show made it to Broadway in 1993, but lasted 25 performances. He wrote the musical Halloween with Sidney Michaels, and although Barbara Cook and José Ferrer were in the cast, it did not reach Broadway.

Television
Leigh established Music Makers, Inc., in 1957 as a radio and television commercial production house and was its creative director. His television music included the instrumental music for the ABC Color Logo (1962–65), the TV commercial jingle "Nobody Doesn't Like Sara Lee",, the Meet the Swinger Polaroid Swinger commercial sung by Barry Manilow and the Benson & Hedges theme "The Dis-Advantages of You," which reached the Top 40 for The Brass Ring in 1967 and was heard in a series of Benson & Hedges cigarette commercials at that time.

Academic legacy
In 1977, Leigh and others at the Yale School of Music established the Keith Wilson scholarship, to be awarded "to an outstanding major in wind instrument playing." A building in The School of Music at Yale University was named "Abby and Mitch Leigh Hall" in 2001.

Death
Leigh died in Manhattan on March 16, 2014, from natural causes at the age of 86.

Awards
Leigh won a Tony Award for composing the music for Man of La Mancha. He was also nominated for a Tony Award as the director of the 1985 revival of The King and I. He received the Contemporary Classics Award from the Songwriter's Hall of Fame for "The Impossible Dream".

References

External links

 http://www.jacksontwentyone.com JACKSON Twenty-One

1928 births
2014 deaths
American musical theatre composers
American theatre managers and producers
Jewish American composers
Fiorello H. LaGuardia High School alumni
Musicians from Brooklyn
Jewish American musicians
Jewish American songwriters
Songwriters from New York (state)
Pupils of Paul Hindemith
Yale School of Music alumni
21st-century American Jews
Tony Award winners